The Upside Down Show is a children's television series produced by Blink Films and Sesame Workshop. It was made for the Noggin channel. The series is set in a strange apartment building where the doors lead to a variety of unusual rooms. It is presented by brothers David and Shane (played by the Umbilical Brothers), who live in the apartment building with their sidekick Puppet, their neighbor Mrs. Foil, and a group of fuzzy creatures called the Schmuzzies. In each episode, David gives the viewers an imaginary remote control that affects the characters and their surroundings.

The series was inspired by the Umbilical Brothers' adult-oriented comedy act SpeedMouse, which was also based on the idea of an imaginary remote. Producers from Sesame Workshop saw SpeedMouse and ordered a pilot episode based on it, which became The Upside Down Show. The pilot was successful, and in 2005, Noggin ordered a season of 13 episodes. The show was written and produced in New York, and it was filmed in Sydney, Australia. The cast and crew featured a mix of Australian and American talent. While creating the series, the writers intentionally included jokes for adults as well as children; Shane Dundas likened The Upside Down Show to making "an adult show for kids."

In 2010, the Umbilical Brothers announced that they had completed a script for a special-length episode titled The Upside Down Movie, which would act as a proper finale for the series. The movie had been in development since 2008. Nickelodeon Australia provided funding for the movie's scriptwriting, but the project needed support from outside investors to start filming, which never occurred. As recently as March 2017, the Umbilical Brothers have stated that they are still interested in making the movie and are trying to find support for it.

History

Production
The show's concept is based on SpeedMouse, a live comedy act that the Umbilical Brothers performed for adult audiences in the 1990s. The plot involved an invisible remote control that dictated the Brothers' actions on stage. Shane Dundas called the remote "a handy idea that we took directly from SpeedMouse and it all grew into a whole another animal." Producers from Sesame Workshop enjoyed the remote control in SpeedMouse and felt that the physical comedy would lend itself to a family-oriented television show. Sesame Workshop approached the Umbilical Brothers with plans to develop a series, and the Brothers accepted. The Upside Down Show was the Brothers' second venture into family television, after Umbilical TV, a set of short films that the Brothers made in the 1990s.

In developing the series, the creators set out to make an "adult show for kids"—adapting the adult-oriented SpeedMouse for a wider audience while also adding layered jokes for parents and older viewers. According to Shane Dundas: "with The Upside Down Show the mantra was 'Well, kids are going to love this but we really want to make sure there are gags in there for the grown-ups as well!'" David Collins elaborated, "The series is filled with gags that will fly over the heads of little ones and straight into the face of the parent stalking behind them. Some of these gags we had to fight [the censors] for." In an interview with The Age, he said, "Basically we'd try to get away with as much as we could. Sometimes the cameras stopped rolling because there were a few moments that were too risque for kids."

A half-hour pilot episode was made from December 2004 to March 2005. The pilot never aired on television, but it was screened at MIPTV Media Market in April 2005. The pilot followed David and Shane searching for the beach, and this storyline was later reworked into an episode of the main show. For the pilot, the show's art department glued the entire living room set to the ceiling to give the look of an "upside down" room; in the final series, the camera is simply turned around at various points to create the upside-down illusion. The character of Puppet had a different design, and he was named "Stretch" in the pilot. David and Shane also wore different costumes: simple T-shirts with swirl designs on them.

The pilot was successful, and Noggin ordered a full season of 13 episodes in 2005. They aired in fall 2006. On December 27, 2006, in an interview with the New York Post, Shane Dundas stated he was unsure if the series would be renewed for a second season, and that Noggin/Nickelodeon would make a final decision in February 2007 about renewing it. On June 1, 2007, the Umbilical Brothers announced on their website that the series would not be renewed for more episodes, and that Nickelodeon USA had decided to end The Upside Down Show after a single season. Unlike Nickelodeon USA, the Australian branch of Nickelodeon was strongly committed to the series and wanted to continue it.

Broadcast
In the United States, the series was first shown on the main Nickelodeon channel as a "sneak peek" on October 13, 2006. Afterward, the series was shown exclusively on Noggin, which aired the show's 13 episodes over a month-long period from October 16, 2006, to November 13, 2006. Noggin aired the episodes slightly out of order; it showed "Art Museum" and "Farm" (episodes 3 and 11) as the premiere episodes, then aired the remainder of the show in its original production order. In Australia, Nickelodeon premiered the episodes on a more sporadic schedule; the series debuted on August 25, 2006, and did not air the last episode until February 2007.

The Upside Down Show also aired on two of Nickelodeon's international channels: Nick Jr. UK and Nickelodeon Asia. Both channels aired the show ahead of the American and Australian premieres. Nick Jr. UK ran the first episode on April 10, 2006, with reruns continuing until January 2007. Nickelodeon Asia premiered the show on August 9, 2006, and it continued to play reruns until 2010.

Unfinished finale movie
In August 2008, the newspaper The Australian announced that the Umbilical Brothers were making a movie adaptation of the show. The Umbilical Brothers also announced this on their Facebook page, writing that "there is a script in development for a movie version of The Upside Down Show." A month later, the newspaper The Sydney Morning Herald published an interview with Shane Dundas and David Collins, in which they revealed that the project would be titled The Upside Down Movie and that it was planned to start filming within the next year. In January 2010, David Collins announced that the script had been finished, and that the project would act as a proper series finale. Collins also confirmed that Nickelodeon Australia was "hugely supportive of trying to get the film made and have been partially funding the script development." The Umbilical Brothers started an online petition to demonstrate public support of the movie, but the project did not receive enough support from outside investors to start filming. In March 2017, Collins stated that he was still trying to find support for the movie.

Characters

 David (played by David Collins) is the older of the two brothers who wears a striped polo shirt and tan-colored shorts. He has super-sensitive hearing and a super-sensitive sense of smell. He is more laid-back and straight-laced than Shane but still tends to get distracted by small things. He loves the Schmuzzies and acts as their good friend, translator, and mentor.
 Shane (played by Shane Dundas) is David's younger brother, who wears brown pants and a blue T-shirt with a fast forward symbol on it. He is more frenetic, impulsive, and hyperactive than David, but he is also a quicker thinker and comes up with many interesting ideas. Shane tends to get annoyed by the unpredictable nature of the Remote, since it often interrupts his daily activities.
 Mrs. Foil (played by Amanda Bishop) is the brothers' friendly, off-beat neighbor who lives in a different apartment. She is blonde and plays the tuba, which she brings with her even when swimming and camping. She tends to appear in odd places at odd times, including many of the "Wrong Turn" rooms, where she is often dressed up in different costumes.
 Puppet (performed and voiced by Mat McCoy) is the brothers' sidekick, roommate, and best friend. He dreams of becoming an actor and film director, and he can often be found practicing monologues or writing screenplays. He is interested in Shakespeare and likes to play unconventional roles. He is generally more rational than David and Shane, but is often just as silly as the boys. He speaks with an American accent.
 The Schmuzzies (performed and voiced by Emma de Vries, Virginia Goodfellow and Alice Osborne) are a group of small, fuzzy, dustball-like creatures who live throughout the apartment. They come in a wide range of bright colors and speak a language called Schmuzzish, which is made up of rhyming sounds and modified English words ("Schmello, Schmuzzies!"). Shane is afraid of them and sees them as pests, while David is good friends with them and is fluent in their language.
 Mary Anneette  Puppet's Cousin
 Fido The Fly He Loves Chocolate Milkshake

Episode structure 
Each episode begins with a cold open showing one or both brothers in the middle of an activity. David introduces "the Remote" by pretending to hold a remote control. He explains that the Remote can control the action on-screen. He demonstrates by pressing various buttons, which control Shane's actions. The Remote also has "wild card" buttons that cause strange or undesired effects. The main one is the "Upside Down" button, which causes the camera to shift to an upside down shot and can only be undone with the "Right Side Up" button. After explaining it, David gives the Remote to the viewer. The brothers ask the viewer to "press the Play button" to start the episode. Before the episode starts, the viewer commonly presses the wrong button and puts the brothers in a bizarre situation. As soon as the play button is pressed, the theme song begins. This sequence features the Action Fingers jumping over the show's title and credits, and it ends with them opening the apartment door.

The rest of the story always starts in David and Shane's living room. Every episode features their sidekick Puppet and the Schmuzzies, who live with the brothers in their apartment. The goal of each story is for David and Shane to get to a certain location. The brothers spend the episode searching for the location through the various doors, windows, and other places in their apartment. The brothers occasionally request help from the viewers, asking them to press buttons on their remote. Their journey takes them to three "Wrong Turn" rooms. The brothers' neighbor Mrs. Foil appears in the different rooms in various costumes, either helping them on their quest or unintentionally causing more trouble. 

At one point on their journey, the brothers always encounter a child who teaches them something and sets them on the correct path. Eventually, they locate their destination "for the very first time" and visit the place in fast motion. The show ends with David and Shane back in their apartment. During the last few minutes of the show, they give the viewer an imaginary souvenir to thank them for their help throughout the episode. During the last moment of the show, they play around in their apartment while the end credits roll.

Episodes

Home media
Despite only having 13 episodes, the series has had a total of eight separate DVD releases. On January 19, 2012, Nickelodeon released all 13 episodes to DVD as a manufacture on demand Amazon exclusive. In Australia, the show's episodes were released across six DVD volumes, each containing 2-3 episodes. Each DVD disc was made to look like one of the Schmuzzies. In June 2009, the Umbilical Brothers temporarily sold an exclusive "Complete Series" DVD collection on their website, which combined the previous six volumes onto a two-disc DVD set. The collection was a limited edition, and it was discontinued after it went out of stock.

Since 2018, the Umbilical Brothers have uploaded the entire series to their public YouTube channel, making every episode available to view for free. In the descriptions of several uploads, David Collins included behind-the-scenes trivia about the episodes. The series was available on the Noggin mobile app from 2015 to 2020, and it was added to Paramount+ in 2021.

Reception

Critical reception 
The series was critically acclaimed for its humor and broad appeal. Larisa Wiseman of Common Sense Media gave the series a 5-star review, calling it "refreshingly original; each episode is filled with clever jokes, puns, music, and tons of physical humor." The Hollywood Reporter called the show "outrageously funny and inventive" and "imaginative to the core," saying that David and Shane "will have young viewers mesmerized. Older viewers also will find a trove of silly antics that are easy to watch and joyful to ponder." Robert Lloyd of the Los Angeles Times wrote that "The Upside Down Show is not only good, but good for you ... But what matters most is that it is delightful ... I noticed, as I watched the show for the first time, that I was sitting cross-legged on the floor about a foot from the TV screen, absolutely entranced." Susan Stewart of The New York Times thought the series was "perfectly calibrated" for children and older viewers. Entertainment Weeklys Eileen Clarke wrote, "Tired of all that 'educational' stuff on TV for kids? Here’s a show that will let them wallow in the wacky, surf in complete silliness, and bandy in the bizarre." Canadian TV producer Pat Ellingson said "adults will get a kick out of the hosts' comic stylings." Writing for The Sydney Morning Herald, Evan McEvoy called the series "good enough to steal a few viewers from adult morning TV."

Awards 
The Upside Down Show received three awards, all in 2007. Because the series was written and produced in America and filmed in Australia, it was eligible for awards in both countries. The show's opening theme won the Creative Craft Daytime Emmy Award for Main Title Design. The series also received a Parents' Choice Award Silver Honor for Television. Nick Jr. Australia received a Logie Award for The Upside Down Show in the category Most Outstanding Children's Program.

Notes

References

External links
 The Upside Down Show on Noggin.com (archive)
 

2006 American television series debuts
2006 Australian television series debuts
2007 American television series endings
2007 Australian television series endings
2000s American children's comedy television series
American preschool education television series
American television shows featuring puppetry
Australian children's television series
Australian preschool education television series
Australian television shows featuring puppetry
Noggin (brand) original programming
Television series about brothers
Television series by Sesame Workshop
2000s preschool education television series